Zastrow is a surname. Notable people with the surname include:

Alexander Heinrich Gebhard von Zastrow (1768–1815), Prussian officer
Charles Zastrow (born 1942), American social scientist
Heinrich von Zastrow (1801–1875), Prussian general
Holger Zastrow (born 1969), German politician
Mitja Zastrow (born 1977), Dutch swimmer